The Anto War is a 1999 Italian comedy-drama film directed by Riccardo Milani.

Cast
Flavio Pistilli as Antò Lu Purk
Federico Di Flauro as Antò Lu Malatu
Paolo Setta as Antò Lu Zorru
Danilo Mastracci as Antò Lu Zombi
Regina Orioli as Sballestrera
Francesco Bruni as Piero Broccoli
Donatella Raffai as herself

References

External links

1999 films
1990s Italian-language films
1999 comedy-drama films
Italian comedy-drama films
Films directed by Riccardo Milani
Films set in Pescara
Films shot in Pescara
1990s Italian films